Immovable Cultural Heritage of Great Importance ( / Nepokretna kulturna dobra od velikog značaja) are those objects of Immovable cultural heritage that enjoy the second-highest level of state protection in the Republic of Serbia, behind the Immovable Cultural Heritage of Exceptional Importance. Immovable Cultural Heritage is classified as being of Great Importance upon decision by the National Assembly of Serbia. They are inscribed in the Central Register of Immovable cultural property maintained by the Institute for the Protection of Cultural Monuments of Serbia. Objects of Immovable cultural heritage have to fulfill one or more of those criteria defined in the Law on Cultural Heritage of 1994 in order to be categorized as being "of great importance":

 importance for a certain area or time-span;
 evidence of social or natural development, or the socio-economic and cultural-historic development conditions during a certain time-span;
evidence about important historic events or persons from the national history.
According to the Law, there are four classes of Immovable Cultural Heritage: Cultural Monuments, Archaeological Sites, Historic Landmarks and Spatial Cultural-Historical Units. Objects in each of those classes can be categorized as being "of great importance" by the National Assembly.

List of Cultural Heritage of Great Importance 
There are currently 2592 objects of immovable cultural heritage inscribed in the Central Register, 582 of which are categorized as being "of great importance" (512 cultural monuments, 25 archaeological sites, 17 historic landmarks and 28 spatial cultural-historical units).

Cultural monuments of Great Importance

Archaeological Sites of Great Importance

Historic Landmarks of Great Importance

Spatial Cultural-Historical Units of Great Importance

See also
Cultural Heritage of Serbia
List of World Heritage Sites in Serbia
List of fortifications in Serbia
List of protected natural resources in Serbia

References 

Lists of tourist attractions in Serbia
Cultural heritage of Serbia